The Solitude Plantation House is located in St. Francisville, Louisiana.  The plantation house was built around 1815 and was added to the National Register of Historic Places in 1983.

It includes elements of Greek Revival and Federal style.

References

Houses on the National Register of Historic Places in Louisiana
Federal architecture in Louisiana
Houses completed in 1815
Houses in West Feliciana Parish, Louisiana
Plantation houses in Louisiana
National Register of Historic Places in West Feliciana Parish, Louisiana
1815 establishments in Louisiana